The National Movement of Young Legislators (NMYL), is a group of elected local lawmakers in the Philippines who are aged 40 years or younger. The local lawmakers are elected officials who hold positions such as municipal/city councilor, municipal/city vice mayor, provincial board member, and provincial vice governor.

History 

NMYL was formed by the Presidential Council for Youth Affairs (PCYA) under President Corazon C. Aquino as part of her administration's youth development agenda. Elected NMYL's founding president was Senator Francis Pangilinan in 1989, when he was still a councilor of Quezon City, Philippines. He saw the need to unite and develop young legislators to develop committed, strong, and principled leaders among youth legislators.

Past Presidents and Officers 

Francis Pangilinan - Philippine Senator; City Councilor; NMYL Founding President
Josefina De la Cruz - Governor of Bulacan; NMYL President
Edgar M. Chatto  - Philippine Congressman; Bohol Vice Governor; NMYL President
Del De Guzman  - Philippine Congressman; Marikina Vice Mayor; NMYL President
Herbert Bautista - Vice Mayor of Quezon City; NMYL President
 Julian ML. Coseteng - Councilor of Quezon City; NMYL President 2004-2007
 Cecilia Clare N. Reyes - Provincial Board Member of Isabela Province;  NMYL President 2007-2010

Notes

References
Sunstar: The Young and the Restless
Liberal Party: Francis Pangilinan

Political party factions in the Philippines